RMS Carmania may refer to the following ocean liners:

  – in service with Cunard Line 1905–32
  – in service with Cunard Line 1962–73

Ship names